Minasse Haile (born 2 January 1930) is an Ethiopian diplomat and politician who served as Minister of Foreign Affairs from 1971 to 1974.

Biography
He conducted his undergraduate education at the University of Wisconsin–Madison from 1946 to 1950. He received a J.D, M.A, and Ph.D. from Columbia Law School and Columbia University in 1954, 1957, and 1961, respectively. Following the overthrow of Emperor Haile Selassie, he went into exile and eventually taught law at Cardozo Law.

References

1930 births
Ethiopian diplomats
Living people
Foreign ministers of Ethiopia
University of Wisconsin–Madison alumni
Columbia Law School alumni
Cardozo School of Law faculty